Chrysoprasis poticuara is a species of beetle in the family Cerambycidae. It was described by Napp and Martins in 1997.

References

Chrysoprasis
Beetles described in 1997